Claes Janszoon Visscher (1587 – 19 June 1652) was a Dutch Golden Age draughtsman, engraver, mapmaker, and publisher. He was the founder of the successful Visscher family mapmaking business. The firm that he established in Amsterdam would be passed down his generations until it was sold to Peter Schenk.

Biography 
Visscher, who was born and died in Amsterdam, was also known as Nicolas Joannes Piscator or Nicolas Joannis Visscher II, after his father who lived ca. 1550–1612. He learned the art of etching and printing from his father, and helped grow the family printing and mapmaking business to one of the largest in his time. It was a family business; his son Nicolaes Visscher I (1618–1679), and his grandson Nicolaes Visscher II (1649–1702) were also mapmakers in Amsterdam on the Kalverstraat. The times were with the Visschers for other reasons; due to the Protestant reformation, the older Bibles with their "Roman Catholic" illustrations were seen as outdated and apocryphal, but to liven up the new Protestant Bibles for the less well-read clergy, the Visschers produced illustrated maps and even landscapes of the places in the Bible. This became a very successful family business, with collaboration with many respected draughtsmen of the day. A new translation of the Bible was underway in the Netherlands, and until then, the new German translation done by Johannes Piscator, published in 1602–1604, was translated into Dutch. Though probably not a relative, his Bible translation was accepted by the Dutch Staten-General in 1602, which only lent more publicity and authenticity to the "Fisher" name.

He first established his company in Amsterdam within a district known for publishing maps, the area saw fellow contemporary mapmakers such as Jodocus Hondius and Pieter van den Keere. There is also a belief that Hondius might have apprenticed Visscher.

The trademark of the Visschers was a fisherman, as he often published under the name Piscator. In his maps, a small fisherman would be strategically placed somewhere near water. If the subject was a landscape without a stream or pond, then often a figure walking with a fishing rod can be seen. Their map plates were reused for a century by other printers who unknowingly copied the entire plates, including the tell-tale fishermen. Observant scholars are thus able to trace the provenance of Bibles, maps, and landscapes from these signs.

Aside from Bibles, Claes Visscher II primarily etched and published landscapes, portraits, and maps. He etched over 200 plates and his maps included elaborate original borders. Visscher died in 1652. He was a publisher of prints by Esaias van de Velde, and David Vinckboons, and was a big influence on Roelant Roghman and on his sister Geertruyd.

Gallery

References 

 Claes Jansz Visscher with some etchings in the Rijksmuseum

External links

Vermeer and The Delft School, a full text exhibition catalog from The Metropolitan Museum of Art, which includes material on Claes Jansz. Visscher (see index)
Pieter Bruegel the Elder: Drawings and Prints, a full text exhibition catalog from The Metropolitan Museum of Art, which includes material on Claes Jansz. Visscher (see index)

1587 births
1652 deaths
17th-century Dutch cartographers
Engravers from Amsterdam
Dutch Golden Age printmakers